Claudia Kreuzig Grinnell is a German-American poet writing in English.

Biography
Claudia Kreuzig Grinnell was born and raised in Germany. She now teaches at the University of Louisiana at Monroe. Her poems have appeared in publications such as The Kenyon Review, Exquisite Corpse, Hayden's Ferry Review, New Orleans Review, Review Americana, Triplopia, Logos, Minneota Review, Diner, Urban Spaghetti, Fine Madness, Greensboro Review and others. Her first full-length book of poetry, Conditions Horizontal, was published by Missing Consonant Press in the fall of 2001. Grinnell was the recipient of the 2000 Southern Women Writers Emerging Poets Award. In 2003, she was a finalist in the Ann Stanford Poetry Prize Competition, and in 2005, she received the Louisiana Division of the Arts Fellowship in poetry. Her second book of poems is All Roads...but This One.

References

Year of birth missing (living people)
Living people
German expatriates in the United States
German women poets
University of Louisiana at Monroe faculty